The 1907–08 international cricket season was from September 1907 to April 1908. The season consists with a single international tour.

Season overview

December

England in Australia

References

International cricket competitions by season
1907 in cricket
1908 in cricket